Alison Lopes Ferreira (born 1 March 1993), simply known as Alison, is a Brazilian footballer who plays as a defensive midfielder for Santos.

Club career

Santos

Born in Mongaguá, São Paulo, Alison joined Santos' youth setup in 2004, aged 11. On 10 September 2011 he made his professional debut, starting in a 1–0 home success over Cruzeiro. However, after only two minutes in field, he had to be replaced due to a knee injury, which kept him sidelined for six months.

Alison later suffered the same injury when he was due to return, only appearing in a match with the under-20 team in January 2013. He was definitely promoted to the first team late in that month, after winning the Copa São Paulo de Futebol Júnior.

On 16 August 2013, after retaining a starting spot under Claudinei Oliveira, Alison renewed his link with Santos until December 2017. However, he suffered an injury during the latter stages of the campaign, and only returned in March 2014.

On 18 July 2014 Alison scored his first professional goal, netting the first of a 2–0 home win against Palmeiras. In February of the following year, however, he suffered another serious knee injury, being sidelined for eight months. He returned to the fields on 29 October, coming on as a late substitute in a 3–1 home win against São Paulo FC.

A backup to Thiago Maia and Renato, Alison only appeared rarely in 2016 before suffering a knee sprain. He went through an arthroscopy in July, being declared fit to play in September.

On 20 January 2017, Alison was loaned to Red Bull Brasil until the end of the 2017 Campeonato Paulista, in order to regain match fitness. Upon returning, he started to feature regularly with the first team under Levir Culpi, becoming a starter after the departure of Thiago Maia to Lille OSC.

Alison made his Copa Libertadores debut on 10 August 2017, starting in a 1–0 home win against Atlético Paranaense. On 5 December, he renewed his contract until the end of 2022.

On 10 November 2020, it was announced that Alison and a further six first team players tested positive for COVID-19. He tested positive for a second time the following 18 January.

Al-Hazem
On 2 August 2021, Saudi club Al-Hazem reached an agreement with Santos for the transfer of Alison. Santos announced his departure eleven days later, and he was announced by his new club three days after that.

On 20 May 2022, Alison terminated his contract with the club after failing to receive wages, but was still sidelined due to a knee injury.

Santos return
On 9 February 2023, Santos announced the return of Alison on a one-year contract.

Career statistics

Honours

Club
Santos
Campeonato Paulista: 2015, 2016

International
Brazil U20
Toulon Tournament: 2014

References

External links

Santos official profile 

1993 births
Living people
Footballers from São Paulo (state)
Brazilian footballers
Association football midfielders
Campeonato Brasileiro Série A players
Saudi Professional League players
Santos FC players
Red Bull Brasil players
Al-Hazem F.C. players
Brazil youth international footballers
Brazilian expatriate footballers
Brazilian expatriate sportspeople in Saudi Arabia
Expatriate footballers in Saudi Arabia